Samuel Louis Graddy III (born February 10, 1964) is an American former athlete and American football player, winner of gold medal in 4 × 100 m relay at the 1984 Summer Olympics.

Early years
Born in Gaffney, South Carolina, Sam Graddy was second in the 100 m and was a member of gold medal winning American 4 × 100 m relay team at the 1983 Pan American Games.

Track and field

Graddy was also a standout track athlete. In 1984, he won the gold medal at the 1984 USA Outdoor Track and Field Championships in the 100 meters with a time of 10.28 seconds, and as a University of Tennessee at Knoxville student, he also won the 100 meters title at the 1984 NCAA Division I Outdoor Track and Field Championships.

At the Los Angeles Olympics, Graddy was second behind Carl Lewis in 100 m and ran the first leg in the American 4 × 100 metres relay team, which won the gold medal with a new world record of 37.83 seconds.

Personal bests

Professional career
After graduating from university of Tennessee, Graddy was signed by the Denver Broncos in 1987. He played in Denver during the 1987 and 1988 seasons catching one pass for 30 yards. After being out of football for the 1989 season, he signed with the Los Angeles Raiders where he played from 1990 to 1992. During his Raider career Graddy was plagued with dropped passes therefore moved down the depth chart and mainly limited to kick return duty. His career highlight was in 1991 when he caught an 80-yard touchdown pass against the Houston Oilers. Graddy ended his career with 18 catches, 477 yards, 26.5 average per reception and 3 touchdowns. He also returned 27 kicks for 458 yards.

References 

1964 births
Living people
People from Gaffney, South Carolina
American male sprinters
Athletes (track and field) at the 1983 Pan American Games
Pan American Games gold medalists for the United States
Pan American Games silver medalists for the United States
Athletes (track and field) at the 1984 Summer Olympics
Olympic gold medalists for the United States in track and field
Olympic silver medalists for the United States in track and field
World Athletics Indoor Championships medalists
Medalists at the 1984 Summer Olympics
American football wide receivers
Los Angeles Raiders players
Denver Broncos players
Players of American football from South Carolina
Pan American Games medalists in athletics (track and field)
Tennessee Volunteers men's track and field athletes
Track and field athletes from South Carolina
University of Tennessee alumni
Universiade medalists in athletics (track and field)
Track and field athletes in the National Football League
Universiade gold medalists for the United States
USA Outdoor Track and Field Championships winners
Medalists at the 1983 Summer Universiade
Medalists at the 1983 Pan American Games